The most thorough treatment of the Kiowa sound system is by Laurel Watkins in a generative framework. A consideration of prosodic phenomena with acoustic analysis is in Sivertsen (1956). Earlier discussions of phonemics are Trager (1960), Merrifield (1959), Wonderly et al. (1954), and Harrington (1928).

Segments

Consonants
The 23 consonants of Kiowa:

In the orthography (used here) of the native Kiowa speaker, Parker McKenzie, who collaborated with both J.P. Harrington and Laurel Watkins, these are represented as below (parenthetic letters are used only at the end of the syllable):

 The labio-velar glide  is only found in Comanche loanwords or in some interjections like  (an expression used to welcome travelers). A phonetic  offglide also occurs after the mid back vowel .
 The palatal fricative  is found only in two cognate roots, the singular and nonsingular suppletive pair for 'small', syáun  and syân  (as well as in their derivatives, like the adverbials syáundé 'a little', syândè 'in small portions').
 Voiceless  when followed by another consonant (and, thus, also syllable-final) are typically reduced to a glottal stop . In careful speech, the bilabial and dental articulations are preserved.
 Ejectives  are strongly articulated.
 Glottal stops.
 The glottal stop  is typically deleted in normal speech. However, in carefully articulated citation forms, the glottal stop is retained. For example, the word váuā́u  ('wash') is usually pronounced  in connected speech.
 Phonetic glottal stops are also automatically inserted after morpheme-final short vowels before concatenation.
 Other phonetic glottal stops are allophones of syllable-final oral stops  (see above) or a phonation effect of the falling tone.
 Velar consonants palatalize before the low front vowel . Being automatic (like aspiration in English), this palatalization is not indicated in McKenzie's orthography. Examples with all four velars are: qám  ('lazy'), cáp  ('onwards'), kál  ('wet'), -gà  ('in'). (Exceptions to this rule arise only in loanwords and are indicated by an apostrophe: c'ā́bòlī̀  'sheep', c'átlìn  'sharpshooter'.)
At the end of utterances, the affricate is partially devoiced.

Vowels

Kiowa has six contrasting vowel qualities with three heights and a front-back distinction. Additionally, there is an oral-nasal contrast on all six vowels. For example, nasality is the only difference between ā́u  ('to gamble') and ā́u  ('to give').

The oral-nasal contrast, however, is neutralized in the environment of nasal consonants, where only nasalized vowels occur. Watkins phonemicizes an oral vowel in these contexts: mā́  ('up') is phonetically , máun  ('probably') is phonetically .

Kiowa vowels have an underlying two-way length contrast (short vs. long). However, a number of phonological issues restrict the length contrast. (See the syllable and phonotactics for details.)

 The high vowels  are lowered to  when they occur before nasal consonants : bímkàui  ('bag') is phonetically , gún  ('to dance' perfective) is phonetically .
The offglides are considered sub-phonemic as they are predictable.
 Low  is only slightly rounded — its position varying between lower-mid to low . When it is short and in open syllables, it is centralized approaching central : dàufôm  ('despicable') →  .
Vowel length is only contrastive in open syllables.  Closed syllables only have phonetic short vowels. Underlying long vowels are shortened in this position (note morphophonemic alternations).

Tone

Kiowa has three tones: high, low, falling. No minimal triple is available, but the distinctions can be illustrated pairwise: à ~ á (agreement prefixes for 1sg and 3pl unaccusatives), ḕ ('when') ~ ḗ ('here'); àl ('also)' ~ âl ('chase' perfective imperative), chḕ ('when') ~ chê ('horse'); cául ('cattle')~ câul ('some'), gṹ('wise') ~ gû ('hit'). Note that length is not indicated on vowels with falling tone in the current orthography: this is because falling tone is generally only realized over long vowels or a vowel plus resonant (or ). However, there are at least two words with falling tone realized before , both of them minimally contrastive with high tone: bót ('guts') ~ bôt ('because'), chát ('door') ~ chât ('cheque'). One speaker has been recorded with the pronunciation  ('big') in contrast to other speakers'  (the compounding form, êl, as in êlmā̀ 'old woman', has falling tone).

The falling tone has glottalized realizations (creaky voice, tense voice, with glottal stop) in some contexts.

There are also a number of tone sandhi effects.

Syllable and phonotactics

Surface syllables in Kiowa must consist of a vowel nucleus. Syllable onsets are optional and can consist of single consonant or a consonant followed by a palatal glide . A single vowel may be followed by an optional syllable coda consonant or the vowel may optionally be long. Thus, the following syllables are found in Kiowa: . This can be succinctly represented as the syllable equation below.

A number of phonotactic restrictions are found limiting the possible combinations of sounds. These are discussed below.

Onset. All consonants can occurs as a single consonant onset.  However,  only occurs word-initially in loan words (e.g., láyàn 'lion', Láut 'Lawton').

Nucleus. The syllable nucleus can be any vowel, which can be either short or long.

Coda. Palatal  only follows the vowels  (i.e. the palatal may not occur after non-low front vowels).

See also

 Kiowa language

Notes

Bibliography

 Harrington, John P. (1928). Vocabulary of the Kiowa language. Bureau of American Ethnology bulletin (No. 84). Washington, D.C.: U.S. Govt. Print. Off.
 Merrifield, William R. (1959). The Kiowa verb prefix. International Journal of American Linguistics, 25, 168-176.
 Sivertsen, Eva. (1956). Pitch problems in Kiowa.  International Journal of American Linguistics, 22, 117-30.
 Trager, Edith C. (1960). The Kiowa language: A grammatical study. University of Pennsylvania. (Doctoral dissertation, University of Pennsylvania).
 Watkins, Laurel J.; & McKenzie, Parker. (1984). A grammar of Kiowa. Studies in the anthropology of North American Indians. Lincoln: University of Nebraska Press. .
 Wonderly, William; Gibson, Lornia; & Kirk, Paul. (1954).  Number in Kiowa: Nouns, demonstratives, and adjectives. International Journal of American Linguistics, 20, 1-7.

External links
 The Power of Kiowa Song: A Collaborative Ethnography

Kiowa language
Native American phonologies